Don Slater (born 4 April 1954) is a British sociologist.

A reader in sociology at the London School of Economics, Slater has researched the use of light in public infrastructure, and new media. He became chief editor of the British Journal of Sociology in 2013, succeeding Richard T. Wright. Slater was replaced by Nigel Dodd in 2014.

References

1954 births
Living people
British sociologists
Academics of the London School of Economics
Academic journal editors